A Woman's Way is a 1916 American silent drama film directed by Barry O'Neil and starring Ethel Clayton, Carlyle Blackwell and Alec B. Francis.

Cast
 Ethel Clayton as Marion Livingston
 Carlyle Blackwell as Howard Stanton
 Alec B. Francis as General John Stanton
 Pierre LeMay as Jack Stanton
 Edward Kimball as John Livingston 
 Montagu Love as Oliver Whitney
 Edith Campbell as Nina Blakemore

References

Bibliography
 Cari Beauchamp. Without Lying Down: Frances Marion and the Powerful Women of Early Hollywood. University of California Press, 1998.

External links
 

1916 films
1916 drama films
1910s English-language films
American silent feature films
Silent American drama films
American black-and-white films
Films directed by Barry O'Neil
World Film Company films
1910s American films